= 1957 Burundian parliamentary election =

Indirect parliamentary elections were held in Burundi in 1957.

== Background ==
The Decree of 14 July 1952 by the Belgian authorities introduced an element of democracy to the Burundian political system. A complicated electoral system was created, which involved seven stages of elections to eventually elect the National Superior Council (French: Superieur du Pays).

The elections began in the sub-chiefdoms, then were held in the chiefdoms, then the territories, and finally at the national level.

== Results ==
The elections in the sub-chiefdoms in 1956, with the elections to the Chiefdom Councils, Territorial Councils and the Superior Council following in 1957. The number of Tutsis elected to all bodies increased, whilst the number of elected Hutus decreased in comparison with the 1954 elections.

Council	Members				
Council	Hutus		Tutsis		Total
Council	Elected	Unelected	Elected	Unelected	Total
Sub-chiefdom councils	2,240	0	1,134	530	3,904
Chiefdom councils	66	0	192	24	282
Territorial councils	12	0	56	24	92
Superior Council	0	2	29		31
Source: Sternberger et al.
