= 1954 Burundian parliamentary election =

Indirect parliamentary elections were held in Burundi in 1954.

== Background ==
The Decree of 14 July 1952 by the Belgian authorities had introduced an element of democracy to the Burundian political system. A complicated electoral system was created, which involved seven stages of elections to eventually elect the National Superior Council (French: Superieur du Pays).

The elections began in the sub-chiefdoms, then were held in the chiefdoms, then the territories, and finally at the national level.

== Results ==
The elections in the sub-chiefdoms and chiefdoms were held in 1953, with the elections to the Territorial Councils and the Superior Council following in 1954.

Council	Members				
Council	Hutus		Tutsis		Total
Council	Elected	Unelected	Elected	Unelected	Total
Sub-chiefdom councils	2,285	0	1,005	499	3,789
Chiefdom councils	71	0	177	24	272
Territorial councils	16	0	52	24	92
Superior Council	0	4	27		31
Source: Sternberger et al.
